Joseph ben Solomon Fiametta (died 1721) was an Italian rabbi at Ancona.

He was the father-in-law of Samson Morpurgo, rabbi of Ancona. He wrote: "Widdui," atonement prayers of the Italian rite, included in the "Tik ḳun Shobabim" of Moses Zacuto, Venice, 1712; "Or Boḳer," containing prayers and seliḥot, Venice, 1709. He wrote also an approbation to Nehemiah Ḥayun's "'Oz le-Elohim," Berlin, 1713, and a panegyric poem on Abraham Cohen's "Kehunnat Abraham," Venice, 1719.

Among the Italian responsa there is one regarding communal taxation signed by Shabbethai Panzieri and Joseph Fiametta.

References
 ;
Julius Fürst, Bibl. Jud. i. 279;
Nepi-Ghirondi, Toledot Gedole Yisrael, pp. 32, 333;
Moritz Steinschneider, Cat. Bodl. col. 1460;
Azulai, Shem ha-Gedolim, ii. 144;
Marco Mortara, Indice, p. 22.

Notes

External links

1721 deaths
18th-century Italian rabbis
Year of birth unknown
People from Ancona
Date of death unknown